Geisler is a surname. Notable people with the surname include:

Alan Geisler (1931–2009), American food chemist, created a red onion sauce used on hot dogs in New York City
Baron Geisler (born 1982), Filipino actor, the son of a Filipina mother and a German American dad
Bruno Geisler (1857–1945), German ornithologist
Christian Geisler (1869–1951), Danish organist and composer
Donald Geisler (born 1978), Filipino taekwondo athlete of German-American descent
Hans Ferdinand Geisler (1891–1966), Luftwaffe commander during World War II
Ilse Geisler (born 1941), East German luger
Ladi Geisler (1927–2011), Czech musician, famous in post-war Germany
Norman Geisler (1932–2019), American Christian apologist, co-founder of Southern Evangelical Seminary outside Charlotte, North Carolina
Peter Geisler, German clarinettist
Robert Geisler (1925–1993), American politician
Rudolf Geisler (1911–1944), highly decorated Oberstleutnant in the Wehrmacht during World War II

See also
James R. Geisler Middle School, public school located in Walled Lake, Michigan
Naturpark Puez-Geisler, nature reserve in the Dolomites in South Tyrol, Italy
Geissler (disambiguation)
Geiszler